Winthrop is a small unincorporated community in Warren Township, Warren County, in the U.S. state of Indiana.

History
Winthrop was platted on March 3, 1884 by farmer Jacob Morgan Rhode (d. February 8, 1919); the name probably comes from a personal name.  A north/south line of the Chicago and Eastern Illinois Railroad known as the "Coal Road" served the town in the late 19th and early 20th centuries.  Operated after 1922 as the Chicago, Attica and Southern Railroad, it deteriorated in the 1930s and was scrapped around 1945.  Few traces of the route remain.

Geography 
The West Fork of Kickapoo Creek flows to the west and south of town.

References 

Unincorporated communities in Indiana
Unincorporated communities in Warren County, Indiana
Populated places established in 1884